Gymnocalycium bruchii is a species of Gymnocalycium from Argentina.

References

External links
 
 

bruchii
Flora of Argentina